Bird Bluff is a rock bluff on the north side of the Fosdick Mountains,  east of Mount Colombo, in the Ford Ranges of Marie Byrd Land. It was mapped by the United States Antarctic Service (1939–41) and by the United States Geological Survey from surveys and from U.S. Navy air photos (1959–65). It was named by the Advisory Committee on Antarctic Names for Commander Charles F. Bird, a Meteorological Officer on the Staff of the U.S. Naval Support Force, Antarctica, 1968.

References 

Cliffs of Marie Byrd Land